Tre'Vius Hodges-Tomlinson (born January 10, 2000) is an American football cornerback for the TCU Horned Frogs. He received three all-conference honors during his time with TCU and won the Jim Thorpe Award in 2022.

High school career
Hodges-Tomlinson attended Midway High School in Waco, Texas. He committed to Texas Christian University (TCU) to play college football.

College career
As a freshman at TCU in 2019, Hodges-Tomlinson played in 12 games and had eight tackles. He became a starter in 2020, and started all 10 games, recording 26 tackles. In 12 games in 2021, he had 41 tackles, two interceptions and a touchdown. Hodges-Tomlinson won the Jim Thorpe Award as a senior in 2022.

Personal life
He is the nephew of Hall of Fame NFL running back LaDainian Tomlinson.

References

External links
TCU Horned Frogs bio

Living people
American football cornerbacks
TCU Horned Frogs football players
All-American college football players
Year of birth missing (living people)